Dulhan is a 1958 Hindi-language film.

Cast
 Raaj Kumar as Mohan 
 Nirupa Roy as Sharda 
 Nanda as Sadhana 
 Jeevan as Anokhelal
 Agha as  Masterji
 Bhagwan Dada as Professor Bhaskande 
 Gajanan Jagirdar as Seth Dhanpal
 Manorama as Chanda

Soundtrack

References

External links
 

1958 films
1950s Hindi-language films
Films scored by Ravi